Gidget Sandoval Herrera (born c. 1966) is a Costa Rican model and beauty queen who was crowned Miss International for 1983.

She is the second delegate from Costa Rica to win the title, held in Osaka, Japan.

Prior to her victory in the said pageant, she participated in the Miss Pan-American Teenager pageant, where she was adjudged Miss Elegance.

References

External links
2008 interview with Gidget Sandoval 

Miss International winners
Miss International 1983 delegates
1960s births
Living people
Costa Rican beauty pageant winners